His Excellency is a 1958 Australian television film.

It was based on a play which had been previously adapted into a 1952 film, His Excellency.

The play was performed in Australia in 1953.

Plot
An ex-docker is appointed governor of a British island colony.

Cast
Stewart Ginn as the Governor
 Harvey Adams
 Lola Brooks 
Ric Hutton 
John Juson
Eric Reiman    
John Tate    
 Owen Weingott

Production
It was Stewart Ginn's first appearance in a TV play. It was directed by Alan Burke who had just done Rose without a Thorn for the ABC and directed Look Back in Anger on stage for the Elizabethan Theatre Trust. Burke went on to become one of the ABC"s leading directors.

See also
List of live television plays broadcast on Australian Broadcasting Corporation (1950s)

References

External links

1958 television films
1958 films
Australian television films
Black-and-white Australian television shows
English-language television shows
1950s Australian television plays
Films directed by Alan Burke (director)